Dečkovo Naselje is a district and a neighborhood of the city of Celje in Slovenia.

Geography of Celje
Districts of the City Municipality of Celje